João Filgueiras Lima (June 19, 1931 – May 21, 2014)  was a Brazilian architect, also known as Lelé.  He won the Grand Prize of the Biennale of Architecture an Engineering in Madrid to Mexico.

References

1931 births
Brazilian architects
2014 deaths